"Diamond Wave" is a song recorded by Japanese singer songwriter Mai Kuraki, taken from her sixth studio album Diamond Wave (2006). It was released on June 21, 2006 by Giza Studio. The song was written by Kuraki herself and Akihito Tokunaga. The remix version of the song "Grand Bleu Mix" was released into the US market on the same day.

Track listing

Charts

Weekly charts

Certification and sales

|-
! scope="row"| Japan (RIAJ)
| 
| 30,977
|-
|}

Release history

References

External links
Mai Kuraki Official Website

2006 singles
Mai Kuraki songs
2006 songs
Giza Studio singles
Songs written by Mai Kuraki
Songs with music by Akihito Tokunaga
Song recordings produced by Daiko Nagato